8Ball & MJG is an American hip hop duo from Memphis, Tennessee. They met at Ridgeway Middle School in 1984. In 1993, the duo released their debut album Comin' Out Hard. They went on to release On the Outside Looking In (1994), On Top of the World (1995), In Our Lifetime (1999), Space Age 4 Eva (2000), Living Legends (2004), Ridin High (2007) and Ten Toes Down (2010).

Career
8Ball & MJG first appeared on the rap scene with their underground 1991 album Listen to the Lyrics. In 1993, they released the successful album Comin' Out Hard. Their subsequent albums in the 1990s, including 1994's On the Outside Looking In, and 1995's On Top of the World cemented their status as some of the South's best rappers. On Top of the World was particularly successful, peaking at #8 on the Billboard 200 and being certified gold. It also contained the song "Space Age Pimpin'", which was 8Ball & MJG's first single to chart, reaching #58 on the Hot R&B/Hip-Hop Singles & Tracks chart and #22 on the Hot Rap Singles chart. After those albums, both 8Ball & MJG released solo albums, first MJG's No More Glory in 1997 and then 8Ball's Lost in 1998. They reunited in 1999 to release their fourth album as a group, titled In Our Lifetime. One year later in 2000, they released their fifth group album entitled Space Age 4 Eva.

In 1996, they appeared on the Red Hot Organization's compilation CD, America Is Dying Slowly, alongside Biz Markie, Wu-Tang Clan, and Fat Joe, among many other prominent hip hop artists. The CD, meant to raise awareness of the AIDS epidemic among African American men, was heralded as "a masterpiece" by the magazine The Source. In the early 2000s, they would sign with Sean Combs' Bad Boy Records. They already had some experience with the label, being featured on the song "The Player Way" from Bad Boy rapper Mase's 1997 album Harlem World. Their first album for Bad Boy Records, Living Legends, came out in 2004 and was certified gold by the Recording Industry Association of America. Their second album on Bad Boy Records was titled Ridin High and was released in March 2007.

Commercially, one of the high points of 8Ball & MJG's career was their being featured on Three 6 Mafia's hit song "Stay Fly" in 2005. That song peaked at #13 on the Billboard Hot 100, which is the biggest hit of Three 6 Mafia's career and the biggest hit for 8Ball & MJG. The song was a collaboration between two of the most successful rap groups from the state of Tennessee, whence Three 6 Mafia also hail. Today, 8Ball and MJG also head their own record labels. 8Ball heads 8 Ways Entertainment (distributed by Koch Entertainment), while MJG heads MJG Muzik. On their label are the young, up and coming Memphis duo, Da Volunteers, who are widely known throughout the Southern United States for their 2006 single, "What's Yo Favorite Color?", which glorifies their neighborhood of Orange Mound.

In September 2007, 8Ball and MJG signed deals in Sacramento, California with Real Talk Entertainment. 8Ball released a group album with E.D.I. Mean of the Outlawz entitled Doin' It Big on April 1, 2008, and MJG released a solo album entitled Pimp Tight on April 29, 2008. In June 2008 the group announced that they officially signed onto T.I.'s record label Grand Hustle. Their eighth album as a group and their first on Grand Hustle, titled Ten Toes Down, was released in May 2010. It reached #36 on the Billboard 200 in its first week.

Discography

Studio albums
 Comin' Out Hard (1993)
 On the Outside Looking In (1994)
 On Top of the World (1995)
 In Our Lifetime (1999)
 Space Age 4 Eva (2000)
 Living Legends (2004)
 Ridin High (2007)
 Ten Toes Down (2010)

8Ball albums
 Lost (1998)
 Almost Famous (2001)
 Lay It Down (2002)
 Light Up the Bomb (2006)
 The Vet & The Rookie (with Devius) (2007)
 Doin' It Big (with E.D.I.) (2008)
 8Ball & Memphis All-Stars: Cars, Clubs & Strip Clubs (2009)
 Life's Quest (2012)

MJG albums
 No More Glory (1997)
 Pimp Tight (2008)
 This Might Be the Day (2008)
 Too Pimpin''' (2013)
 Too Pimpin' 2.0'' (2014)

References

External links
 Official website
 Bad Boy Online
 

1991 establishments in Tennessee
American hip hop groups
American musical duos
Bad Boy Records artists
Gangsta rap groups
Hip hop duos
Musical groups established in 1991
Musical groups from Memphis, Tennessee
Rappers from Memphis, Tennessee
Southern hip hop groups
Suave House Records artists
African-American musical groups